Calliclinus nudiventris is a species of labrisomid blenny endemic to the Pacific coast of Chile.

References

nudiventris
Fish described in 1979
Taxa named by Fernando Cervigón
Taxa named by Germán Pequeño Reyes
Endemic fauna of Chile